This article lists the records of Newcastle United Football Club.

Club records

Attendances
 Highest attendance – 68,386 (v. Chelsea, First Division, 3 September 1930)
 Highest average attendance – 56,299, Second Division, 1947-48

Wins
 Record victory – 13–0 (v. Newport County, Second Division, 5 October 1946)

Defeats
 Record defeat – 0–9 (v.  Burton Wanderers, Second Division, 15 April 1895)

Goals
 Most League goals scored in a season – 98 in 42 matches, First Division, 1951–52
 Fewest League goals scored in a season – 30 in 42 matches, Second Division, 1980–81
 Most League goals conceded in a season – 109 in 42 matches, First Division, 1960–61
 Fewest League goals conceded in a season – 33 in 34 matches, First Division, 1904–05

Highest transfer fees paid

Highest transfer fees received

Player records

Appearances
 Youngest player – Steve Watson, 16 years 233 days (v. Wolves, Second Division, 10 November 1990)
 Youngest player in European competition – Adam Campbell, 17 years 236 days (v. Atromitos, UEFA Europa League, 23 August 2012)
 Oldest player – Billy Hampson, 44 years 225 days (v. Birmingham City, First Division, 9 April 1927)

Most appearances
As of 25 November 2012. (Competitive matches only, includes appearances as substitute):

 Current player with most appearances – Jamaal Lascelles, 223 (as of 4 March 2023)

Goalscorers
 Most goals in a season – 41, Andy Cole , (1993/94)
 Most League goals in a season – 36, Hughie Gallacher, (1926–27)
 Most goals in a single match – 6, Len Shackleton (v. Newport County, Second Division, 5 October 1946)
 Most goals in the League – 178, Jackie Milburn (1946 to 1957)
 Most goals in European competition – 30 in 52 matches, Alan Shearer
 Fastest recorded goal – 10.4 seconds, Alan Shearer (v. Manchester City, Premier League, 18 January 2003)
 Most prolific goals per game scorer – Papiss Cissé (13 goals in 14 games, 2011–12)

Source:

Top scorers

Source:

 Current player with most goals – Callum Wilson, 27 (as of 4 February 2023)

Managerial records

Newcastle in Europe

League finishing positions

Personal honours

English Football Hall of Fame
The following have either played for or managed Newcastle United and have been inducted into the English Football Hall of Fame :

Scottish Football Hall of Fame
The following have either played for or managed Newcastle United and have been inducted into the Scottish Football Hall of Fame :

Welsh Sports Hall of Fame
The following have played for Newcastle United and have been inducted into the Welsh Sports Hall of Fame :

Players
  Ivor Allchurch (1995 inductee)
  Ian Rush (2001 inductee)

European Hall of Fame
The following have played for Newcastle United and have been inducted into the European Hall of Fame:

Football League 100 Legends
The following have played for Newcastle United and were included in the Football League 100 Legends :

  John Barnes
  Paul Gascoigne
  Kevin Keegan
  Malcolm Macdonald
  Jackie Milburn
  Len Shackleton
  Alan Shearer
  Bill McCracken
  Hughie Gallacher
  Ivor Allchurch
  Ian Rush

PFA Players' Player of the Year
The following have won the PFA Players' Player of the Year award while playing for Newcastle United :
 1996  Les Ferdinand
 1997  Alan Shearer

PFA Young Player of the Year
The following have won the PFA Young Player of the Year award while playing for Newcastle United :
 1988  Paul Gascoigne
 1994  Andy Cole
 2002  Craig Bellamy
 2003  Jermaine Jenas
Source:

PFA Team of the Year
The following have been included in the PFA Team of the Year while playing for Newcastle United :
 1974  Malcolm Macdonald (First Division)
 1979  Peter Withe (Second Division)
 1980  Peter Withe (Second Division)
 1983  Kevin Keegan (Second Division)
 1984  Kevin Keegan (Second Division)
 1985  Chris Waddle (First Division)
 1987  Peter Beardsley (First Division)
 1988  Paul Gascoigne (First Division)
 1990  Micky Quinn (Second Division)
 1993  John Beresford,  Lee Clark,  Gavin Peacock (First Division)
 1994  Peter Beardsley (Premier League)
 1996  Robert Lee,  Les Ferdinand,  David Ginola (Premier League)
 1997  David Batty,  Alan Shearer (Premier League)
 1998  David Batty (Premier League)
 2002  Shay Given (Premier League)
 2003  Kieron Dyer,  Alan Shearer (Premier League)
 2006  Shay Given (Premier League)
 2010  Fabricio Coloccini,  Jose Enrique,  Kevin Nolan,  Andy Carroll (Championship)
 2012  Fabricio Coloccini (Premier League)
 2017  Jamaal Lascelles,  Jonjo Shelvey,  Dwight Gayle (Championship)

Premier League Golden Boot
The following have won the Premier League Golden Boot award while playing for Newcastle United :
 1994  Andy Cole
 1997  Alan Shearer

Premier League Manager of the Season
The following have won the Premier League Manager of the Season award while managing for Newcastle United :
 2012  Alan Pardew

Premier League LMA Manager of the Year
The following have won the LMA Manager of the Year award while managing for Newcastle United :
 2012  Alan Pardew

References

External links
 Past players database at toon1892.co.uk

Records and Statistics
Newcastle United